Gavriil is a variant of the name Gabriel and may refer to:

Gavriil Abramovich Ilizarov (1921–1992), Soviet physician
Gavriil Adrianovich Tikhov (1875–1960), Belarusian astronomer
Gavriil Baranovsky (1860–1920), Russian architect, civil engineer, art historian and publisher
Gavriil Beljagin (1870–1936), Russian-Estonian politician, former mayor of Reval (now Tallinn, Estonia)
Gavriil Belostoksky (1684–1690), the child saint in the Russian Orthodox Church
Gavriil Callimachi (1689–1786), monk at Putna Monastery who became Metropolitan of Moldavia
Gavriil Gorelov (1880–1966), Russian painter
Gavriil Ivanovich Golovkin (1660–1734), Russian statesman
Gavriil Kachalin (1911–1995), Soviet/Russian football player and coach
Gavriil Kharitonovich Popov (born 1936), Russian politician and economist
Gavriil Munteanu (1812–1869), Romanian scientist and translator
Gavriil Musicescu (1847–1903), Romanian composer, conductor and musicologist
Gavriil Nikolayevich Popov (1904–1972), Soviet-era Russian composer
Gavriil Pribylov (died 1796), Russian navigator who discovered St. George Island and St. Paul Island
Gavriil Veresov (1912–1979), Soviet chess player

See also 
 Gavril
 Gavrilo

Romanian masculine given names
Russian masculine given names